Margaret Forster (25 May 1938 – 8 February 2016) was an English novelist, biographer, memoirist, historian and critic, best known for the 1965 novel Georgy Girl, made into a successful film of the same name, which inspired a hit song by The Seekers. Other successes were a 2003 novel, Diary of an Ordinary Woman, biographies of Daphne du Maurier and Elizabeth Barrett Browning, and her memoirs Hidden Lives and Precious Lives.

Early life and education
Forster was born in the Raffles council estate in Carlisle, England. Her father, Arthur Forster, was a mechanic or factory fitter, her mother, Lilian (née Hind), a housewife who had worked as a clerk or secretary before her marriage.

Forster attended Carlisle and County High School for Girls (1949–1956), a grammar school. She went on to win an open scholarship to read history at Somerville College, Oxford, graduating in 1960. Her first job was two years (1961–1963) of teaching English at Barnsbury Girls' School in Islington, north London. During that time she started to write, but her first draft novel was rejected.

Writing

Novels
Forster's first published novel Dames' Delight, loosely based on her experiences at Oxford, launched her writing career in 1964. Her second, published the following year, was a bestseller: Georgy Girl describes the choices open to a young working-class woman in London in the Swinging Sixties. It was adapted as a successful 1966 film starring Lynn Redgrave as Georgy, with Charlotte Rampling, Alan Bates and James Mason, for which Forster co-wrote the screenplay with Peter Nichols. The book was also adapted as a short-lived Broadway musical, Georgy, in 1970.

Forster wrote prolifically in the 1960s and 1970s while bringing up three children, but later criticised many of her own early novels as "skittery", feeling she had not found a voice until her 1974 novel The Seduction of Mrs Pendlebury. Those early novels are mainly light and humorous, driven by a strong plot. An exception was The Travels of Maudie Tipstaff (1967), which presents the difference in values between generations in a Glaswegian family.

The theme of family relations became prominent in her later works. Mother, Can You Hear Me? (1979) and Private Papers (1986) are darker in tone. She tackled subjects such as single mothers and young offenders. Have the Men Had Enough? (1989) scours care of the elderly and the problem of Alzheimer's disease, inspired by her mother-in-law's decline and death from the disease. In 1991, she and her husband, Hunter Davies, contributed to a BBC2 First Sight episode "When Love Isn't Enough", telling Marion Davies's story; Forster sharply criticised government policies on care for the elderly.

The publisher Carmen Callil sees as Forster's best work Lady's Maid (1990), a historical novel about Elizabeth Barrett Browning viewed through the eyes of her maid. Diary of an Ordinary Woman (2003), narrated as the diary of a fictional woman who lives through the major events of the 20th century, is so realistic that many readers believed it was an authentic diary. Other later novels include The Memory Box (1999) and Is There Anything You Want? (2005). Her final novel, How to Measure a Cow, was published in March 2016.

Forster published over 25 novels. A lifelong feminist and socialist, most of her works address these themes. Callil ascribes to Forster a world view "shaped by her sense of her working-class origins: most of her stories were about women's lives." Author Valerie Grove places her novels as being about "women's lives and the deceit within families".

Biographies, memoirs and other non-fiction
Forster's non-fiction included 14 biographies, historical works and memoirs. Her best-known biographies are those of the novelist Daphne du Maurier (1993) and the poet Elizabeth Barrett Browning (1988). The former was a groundbreaking exploration of the author's sexuality and her association with Gertrude Lawrence, filmed by the BBC as Daphne in 2007. In her biography of Barrett Browning, Forster draws on recently found letters and papers that shed light on the poet's life before she met and eloped with Robert Browning, replacing the myth of an invalid poet guarded by an ogre-like father with a more nuanced picture of an active, difficult woman, complicit in her virtual imprisonment.

Forster also wrote fictionalised biographies of the novelist William Makepeace Thackeray (1978) and the artist Gwen John (2006). Significant Sisters (1984) chronicled the growing feminist movement through the lives of eight pioneering British and American women: Caroline Norton, Elizabeth Blackwell, Florence Nightingale, Emily Davies, Josephine Butler, Elizabeth Cady Stanton, Margaret Sanger and Emma Goldman. Good Wives (2001) surveyed contemporary and historical women married to famous men, including Mary Livingstone, Fanny Stevenson, Jennie Lee and herself. Her other historical writings include Rich Desserts and Captain's Thin (1997), an account of the Carr's biscuit factory in Carlisle.

Forster's two memoirs based on her family background, Hidden Lives: A Family Memoir (1995) and Precious Lives (1998) join an autobiographical My Life in Houses (2014). Hidden Lives, drawing on the life of her grandmother, a servant with a secret illegitimate daughter, was praised by the historian and critic Claire Tomalin as "a slice of history to be recalled whenever people lament the lovely world we have lost." Frances Osborne cites it as her own inspiration for becoming a biographer: "It opened my eyes to how riveting the history of real girl-next-door women could be." The sequel, Precious Lives, tackled Forster's father, whom she reportedly disliked.

Broadcasting, journalism and other roles
Forster joined the BBC Advisory Committee on the Social Effects of Television (1975–1977) and the Arts Council Literary Panel (1978–1981). She served as a Booker Prize judge in 1980. She was the main non-fiction reviewer for the Evening Standard (1977–1980). She contributed often to literature programmes on television and BBC Radio 4, and to newspapers and magazines. She was interviewed by Sue Lawley for Radio 4's Desert Island Discs in 1994.

Awards
Forster was elected a Fellow of the Royal Society of Literature in 1975. She gained several awards for non-fiction. Elizabeth Barrett Browning: A Biography won the Heinemann Award of the Royal Society of Literature (1988), Daphne du Maurier: The Secret Life of the Renowned Storyteller the Writers' Guild Award for Best Non-Fiction (1993) and the Fawcett Society Book Prize (1994). Rich Desserts and Captain's Thin: A Family and Their Times 1831–1931 won the Lex Prize of The Global Business Book Award (1998). Precious Lives won the J. R. Ackerley Prize for Autobiography (1999).

Personal life
Forster met the writer, journalist and broadcaster Hunter Davies in their native Carlisle as a teenager. They married in 1960, right after she had completed her finals. The marriage lasted until Forster's death.

They moved to London, where Davies had a job, at first living in rented accommodation in Hampstead, then buying and renovating a Victorian house in Boscastle Road, Dartmouth Park, north London, which remained their main home.

After the success of Georgy Girl in the mid-1960s, Forster bought a house for her mother. The couple had three children, a son and two daughters; Caitlin Davies is an author and journalist. The family lived for some time in the Algarve in Portugal, before returning to London. They also had homes in Caldbeck and Loweswater in the Lake District.

She led a somewhat reclusive life, often refusing to attend book signings and other publicity events. Her friends included broadcaster Melvyn Bragg and playwright Dennis Potter. Forster contracted breast cancer in the 1970s and had two mastectomies. A further cancer diagnosis ensued in 2007. By 2014, the cancer had metastasized, and she died in February 2016, aged 77.

Legacy
The British Library acquired the Margaret Forster Archive in March 2018, which consists of material relating to her works, professional and private correspondence, and personal papers. It includes manuscripts and typescript drafts of most of her published work, and some personal diaries.

Selected works
Novels

1964 Dames' Delight (Jonathan Cape)
1965 The Bogeyman (Secker & Warburg)
1965 Georgy Girl (Secker & Warburg)
1967 The Travels of Maudie Tipstaff (Secker & Warburg)
1968 The Park (Secker & Warburg)
1969 Miss Owen-Owen is at Home (Secker & Warburg)
1970 Fenella Phizackerley (Secker & Warburg)
1971 Mr Bone's Retreat (Secker & Warburg)
1974 The Seduction of Mrs Pendlebury (Secker & Warburg)
1979 Mother Can You Hear Me? (Secker & Warburg)
1980 The Bride of Lowther Fell: a Romance (Secker & Warburg)
1981 Marital Rites (Secker & Warburg)
1986 Private Papers (Chatto & Windus)

1989 Have the Men Had Enough? (Chatto & Windus)
1990 Lady's Maid (Chatto & Windus)
1991 The Battle for Christabel (Chatto & Windus)
1994 Mother's Boys (Chatto & Windus)
1996 Shadow Baby (Chatto & Windus)
1999 The Memory Box (Chatto & Windus)
2003 Diary of an Ordinary Woman 1914–1995 (Chatto & Windus)
2005 Is There Anything You Want? (Chatto & Windus)
2006 Keeping the World Away (Chatto & Windus)
2007 Over (Chatto & Windus)
2010 Isa and May (Chatto & Windus)
2013 The Unknown Bridesmaid (Chatto & Windus)
2016 How to Measure a Cow (Chatto & Windus)

Biography and history

1973 The Rash Adventurer: The Rise and Fall of Charles Edward Stuart (Secker & Warburg)
1978 Memoirs of a Victorian Gentleman: William Makepeace Thackeray (Secker & Warburg)
1984 Significant Sisters: The Grassroots of Active Feminism 1839–1939 (Secker & Warburg)
1988 Elizabeth Barrett Browning: A Biography (Chatto & Windus)

1993 Daphne du Maurier: The Secret Life of the Renowned Storyteller (Chatto & Windus)
1997 Rich Desserts and Captain's Thin: A Family and Their Times 1831–1931 (Chatto & Windus)
2001 Good Wives?: Mary, Fanny, Jennie & Me 1845–2001 (Chatto & Windus)
2006 Keeping the World Away (Chatto & Windus)

Family memoirs and autobiography
1995 Hidden Lives: A Family Memoir (Viking)
1998 Precious Lives (Chatto & Windus)
2014 My Life in Houses (Chatto & Windus)
2017 Diary of an Ordinary Schoolgirl (Chatto & Windus)

Literary editions
1984 Drawn from Life: The Journalism of William Makepeace Thackeray (Folio Society)
1988 Elizabeth Barrett Browning, Selected Poems (Chatto & Windus)
1991 Virginia Woolf, Flush: A Biography (1933) New intro. by Margaret Forster (Hogarth Press)

References

Further reading
David Bordelon, "Margaret Forster", in Twentieth Century Literary Biographers (Dictionary of Literary Biography, Vol. 155) (Detroit: Gale, 1995), pp. 76–87
"Forster, Margaret" in The Oxford Companion to English Literature. 6th ed. rev., ed. Margaret Drabble. (Oxford: Oxford University Press, 2000)
Rosanna Greenstreet, "My perfect weekend: Margaret Forster", The Times, 19 December 1992 [Interview]
"Margaret Forster'", Contemporary Literary Criticism, Vol. 149 (Detroit: Gale, 2002), pp. 62–107
"Margaret Forster", Contemporary British Novelists, ed. Nick Rennison (London: Routledge, 2005), pp. 72–76, 
Merritt Moseley, "Margaret Forster", British and Irish Novelists since 1960 (Dictionary of Literary Biography, Vol. 271, Detroit: Gale, 2003), pp. 139–155
Christina Patterson, "A life less ordinary: Margaret Forster worries, after 30 books, that she loves writing too much", The Independent, 15 March 2003, pp. 20–21 [Interview]
Annie Taylor, "The difference a day made (14 May 1957)... Margaret Forster was on a mission", The Guardian, 6 June 1996 [Interview]
Kathleen Jones Margaret Forster: An Introduction (Northern Lights; 2003)
Kathleen Jones, Margaret Forster: A Life in Books (The Book Mill; 2012)

External links

Lindsay, Cora, 'Critical perspective (and biog & bibliog. on Margaret Forster)' Contemporary Writers (British Council)
Margaret Forster at Random House (publisher's website)
Margaret Forster discusses her latest book Isa and May with The Interview Online

1938 births
2016 deaths
Alumni of Somerville College, Oxford
English biographers
English women journalists
English literary critics
Women literary critics
English women novelists
Fellows of the Royal Society of Literature
People from Carlisle, Cumbria
English women non-fiction writers
Women biographers